The Leeds Freedom Bridge is a railway bridge (HUL4/53) that crosses over the area known as gayleeds on Lower Briggate in Leeds, West Yorkshire. This area is also where an annual LBGT parade Leeds Pride finishes, the bridge is now painted in the rainbow colours of the rainbow flag.

The bridge was due vital repairs by Network Rail but it was suggested to them local LGBT campaigner Thomas Wales that they should also take this opportunity to re-paint the bridge in the rainbow colours of the Rainbow flag in order to relate to the LGBT area of gayleeds surrounding it. The maintenance work on the bridge began in September 2016 and was completed with the paintwork just in time for Valentines Day in February 2017. Once it was completed it became known as the 'Freedom Bridge" a term coined by local LGBT activist Ross McCusker, the term itself relates to the rainbow paintwork which is inspired by the late San Francisco artist Gilbert Baker's Freedom Flag.

LGBT campaigner Thomas Wales mentioned that the idea came about because he wanted to highlight the changing, progressive landscape of the city. Leeds City Council and local business' also contributed their support to the project.

References 

Buildings and structures in Leeds
Bridges in West Yorkshire
Listed buildings in Leeds